Chase Blair Gasper (born January 25, 1996) is an American professional soccer player who plays as a left-back for LA Galaxy of Major League Soccer.

Career

Youth & College
Gasper attended the University of California, Los Angeles, where he played college soccer for three seasons, including a redshirt year in 2016. In 2017, Gasper transferred to the University of Maryland to be closer to his father, who was diagnosed with small-fiber neuropathy.

While in college, Gasper played with PSA Elite during their Lamar Hunt US Open Cup run in 2015, as well as in the Premier Development League with FC Golden State Force in 2016.

Professional career
On January 11, 2019, Gasper was drafted 15th overall in the 2019 MLS SuperDraft, by Minnesota United after they traded $50,000 of General Allocation Money to Chicago Fire to secure the pick.

On May 4, 2022, Gasper was traded to MLS side LA Galaxy in exchange for $450,000 in General Allocation Money, with an additional $300,000 if certain performance metrics are achieved.

International
On February 1, 2020, Gasper earned his first senior cap for the United States national team as a substitute in a friendly match against Costa Rica.

Career statistics

Club

International

References

External links
 

1996 births
Living people
American soccer players
Association football defenders
FC Golden State Force players
LA Galaxy players
Major League Soccer players
Maryland Terrapins men's soccer players
Minnesota United FC draft picks
Minnesota United FC players
Soccer players from Alexandria, Virginia
UCLA Bruins men's soccer players
USL League Two players
United States men's international soccer players
Sportspeople from Alexandria, Virginia